Leander Paes and Jan Siemerink were the defending champions but they competed with different partners that year, Paes with Mahesh Bhupathi and Siemerink with Jack Waite.

Siemerink and Waite lost in the quarterfinals to George Bastl and Irakli Labadze.

Bhupathi and Paes won in the final 7–6(7–4), 6–2 against Kevin Kim and Jim Thomas.

Seeds
Champion seeds are indicated in bold text while text in italics indicates the round in which those seeds were eliminated.

  Bob Bryan /  Mike Bryan (quarterfinals)
  Mahesh Bhupathi /  Leander Paes (champions)
  David Macpherson /  Grant Stafford (semifinals)
  Rick Leach /  Mitch Sprengelmeyer (first round)

Draw

External links
 2001 U.S. Men's Clay Court Championships Doubles Draw

2001 U.S. Men's Clay Court Championships